A vulnerable species is a species which has been categorized by the International Union for Conservation of Nature as being threatened with extinction unless the circumstances that are threatening its survival and reproduction improve.

Vulnerability is mainly caused by habitat loss or destruction of the species' home. Vulnerable habitat or species are monitored and can become increasingly threatened. Some species listed as "vulnerable" may be common in captivity, an example being the military macaw.

There are currently 5,196 animals and 6,789 plants classified as Vulnerable, compared with 1998 levels of 2,815 and 3,222, respectively. Practices such as cryoconservation of animal genetic resources have been enforced in efforts to conserve vulnerable breeds of livestock specifically.

Criteria

The International Union for Conservation of Nature uses several criteria to enter species in this category. A taxon is Vulnerable when it is not critically endangered or Endangered but is facing a high risk of extinction in the wild in the medium-term future, as defined by any of the following criteria (A to E):

A) Population reduction in the form of either of the following:

An observed, estimated, inferred or suspected population size reduction of ≥ 50% over the last 10 years or three generations, whichever is the longer, provided the causes of the reduction are clearly reversible AND understood AND ceased. This measurement is based on (and specifying) any of the following:
direct observation
an index of abundance appropriate for the taxon
a decline in area of occupancy, extent of occurrence or quality of habitat
actual or potential levels of exploitation
the effects of introduced taxa, hybridisation, pathogens, pollutants, competitors or parasites.
A reduction of at least 20%, projected or suspected to be met within the next ten years or three generations, whichever is the longer, based on (and specifying) any of (2), (3), (4) or (5) above.

B) Extent of occurrence estimated to be less than 20,000 km2 or area of occupancy estimated to be less than 2,000 km2, and estimates indicating any two of the following:

Severely fragmented or known to exist at no more than ten locations.
Continuing decline, inferred, observed or projected, in any of the following:
extent of occurrence
area of occupancy
area, extent or quality of habitat
number of locations or subpopulations
number of mature individuals
Extreme fluctuations in any of the following:
extent of occurrence
area of occupancy
number of locations or subpopulations
number of mature individuals

C) Population estimated to number fewer than 10,000 mature individuals and either:

An estimated continuing decline of at least 10% within 10 years or three generations, whichever is longer, or
A continuing decline, observed, projected, or inferred, in numbers of mature individuals and population structure in the form of either:
severely fragmented (i.e. no subpopulation estimated to contain more than 1,000 mature individuals)
all mature individuals are in a single subpopulation

D) Population very small or restricted in the form of either of the following:

Population estimated to number less than 1,000 mature individuals.
Population is characterised by an acute restriction in its area of occupancy (typically less than 20 km2) or in the number of locations (typically less than five). Such a taxon would thus be prone to the effects of human activities (or stochastic events whose impact is increased by human activities) within a very short period of time in an unforeseeable future, and is thus capable of becoming Critically Endangered or even Extinct in a very short period.

E) Quantitative analysis showing the probability of extinction in the wild is at least 10% within 100 years.

The examples of vulnerable animal species are hyacinth macaw, mountain zebra, gaur, black crowned crane and blue crane

See also
:Category:IUCN Red List vulnerable species for an alphabetical list
Cryoconservation of animal genetic resources
List of vulnerable amphibians
List of vulnerable arthropods
List of vulnerable birds
List of vulnerable fishes
List of vulnerable insects
List of vulnerable invertebrates
List of vulnerable mammals
List of vulnerable molluscs
List of vulnerable reptiles

Notes and references

External links
List of Vulnerable species as identified by the IUCN Red List of Threatened Species

 
Biota by conservation status
IUCN Red List
Environmental conservation